
The following is a list of episodes of Wait Wait... Don't Tell Me!, NPR's news panel game, that aired during 2020.  All episodes, unless otherwise indicated, feature host Peter Sagal and announcer/scorekeeper Bill Kurtis.  Dates indicated are the episodes' original Saturday air dates.  Job titles and backgrounds of the guests reflect their status at the time of their appearance.

Through the week of March 7, unless also otherwise indicated, Wait Wait episodes originated from Chicago's Chase Auditorium.  As a social distancing precaution during the COVID-19 pandemic, episodes after March 14 were produced without live audiences, and from March 21 onward were produced through the facilities of Wait Wait co-producer WBEZ (participants joined the show through remote links).

January

February

March

April

May

June

July

August

September

October

November

December

References

External links
Wait Wait... Don't Tell Me! official website
WWDT.me, an unofficial Wait Wait historical site

Wait Wait... Don't Tell Me!
Wait Wait Don't Tell Me
Wait Wait Don't Tell Me